Standard license plates of Transnistria are 520 mm wide and 112 mm high, made of metal with 6 embossed characters - one letter, three numbers and two more letters - written using the DIN 1451 Mittelschrift font. On the left part of the plates there is also a modified euroband on a white background, having the flag of the PMR instead of the EU symbol. A holographic sticker in the place of the international country code underneath it was placed until 2015, when a law was revised, additionally removing black separation line between euroband and registration number; instead, two interpolated grey sine waves were added on the bottom of the plate. Government plates only have 5 embossed characters - three numbers and two letters. Only symbols that are common to both the Cyrillic and the Latin alphabets are used, and with their Cyrillic meaning (A, B, C, E, H, K, M, P, T, X, Y). Its current design derives from Moldovan plates of 1992 design, but is slightly changed. Military plates are using Soviet design from 1959, and tractor plates are also using Soviet design, but from 1980.

The first letter denotes the town or district where the vehicle was registered:

There is an ongoing debate between the Moldovan authorities and the government of Transnistria on a design to be used on Transnistrian plates that is acceptable for Moldova also. Moldovan authorities have been reported to confiscate Transnistrian plates as the registration of vehicles in the Transnistrian region is illegal for Moldovans. In 2018, Transnistrian began issuing a neutral design with MD sticker license plate that works in the European Union.

See also
Vehicle registration plates of Moldova

References

External links

Law of Transnistria
Road transport in Moldova
Transnistria
Moldova transport-related lists